Bev Vincent is an essayist author of fiction and a literary critic, he also is the author of The Road to the Dark Tower and The Stephen King Illustrated Companion.

Selected bibliography
The Road to the Dark Tower (2005, Cemetery Dance Publications) (illustrated by Glenn Chadbourne) 
Stephen King: A Complete Exploration of His Work, Life, and Influences (2022, Quarto) ISBN 978-0-7603-7681-2
The Good, The Bad, & The Ugly: Eight Secondary Characters from the Dark Tower Series (2005, Cemetery Dance Publications) (illustrated by Glenn Chadbourne). Part of a free promotion.
The Illustrated Stephen King Trivia Book (2005, Cemetery Dance Publications) - Co-edited by Brian Freeman and illustrated by Glenn Chadbourne 
The Stephen King Illustrated Companion (2009, Fall River Press) 
The Dark Tower Companion (2013, New American Library) 
Flight or Fright (2018, Cemetery Dance Publications / Hodder & Stoughton) : an anthology co-edited by Stephen King) 
The short story Bloody Sunday found in The Book of Extraordinary New Sherlock Holmes Stories: The Best New Original Stories of the Genre  ISBN 978-1-64250-432-3 
Blaze of Glory (2021, short story, Budgie Smuggler Games, Voices of Varuna: A Renegade Legion Anthology)

References

External links
 Official site

Living people
The Dark Tower (series)
1961 births
American male non-fiction writers